Florian Zellhofer (born 17 August 1988) is an Austrian footballer who currently plays as a striker for First Vienna FC.

External links
 

1988 births
Living people
Austrian footballers
SKN St. Pölten players
FC Lustenau players
First Vienna FC players
Association football forwards